Solute carrier family 17 (organic anion transporter), member 3 is a protein that in humans is encoded by the SLC17A3 gene.

Function

The protein encoded by this gene is a voltage-driven transporter that excretes intracellular urate and organic anions from the blood into renal tubule cells. Two transcript variants encoding different isoforms have been found for this gene. The longer isoform is a plasma membrane protein with transporter activity while the shorter isoform localizes to the endoplasmic reticulum.

See also
 Glycogen storage disease type I

References

Further reading 

 
 
 
 
 
 
 

Human proteins
Solute carrier family